Lentimonas is a bacterial genus from the family of Puniceicoccaceae with one known species (Lentimonas marisflavi).

References

Bacteria genera
Monotypic bacteria genera
Taxa described in 2010
Verrucomicrobiota